Oleksandr Oleksandrovych Moroz (born 29 February 1944) is a Ukrainian politician. He was the Chairman of the Verkhovna Rada twice, from 1994 to 1998 and again from 2006 to 2007. Moroz is one of the founders and the leader of the Socialist Party of Ukraine, formerly an influential political party in Ukraine. Moroz lost parliamentary representation when the Socialist Party failed to secure sufficient number of votes (2.86%) in the 2007 snap parliamentary election, falling 0.14% short of the 3% election threshold.

Early life and career
After graduating from the local school in 1960, Moroz graduated from the Agricultural Academy of the Ukrainian SSR to become a mechanical engineer. He then worked in many careers, including as a teacher and engineer for twelve years. Moroz joined the Communist Party of the Soviet Union, moving from the First Secretary of local Regional Committee of the Communist Party to the position of the Head of the Kyiv Oblast Committee and the Oblast Trade Union Committee. He was a recipient of the Medal "For Labour Valour". He was a member of the Communist Party of the Soviet Union from 1972 to 1991.

Kravchuk and Kuchma years 
Moroz became a deputy of the Verkhovna Rada in 1990. During the August 1991 Declaration of Independence of Ukraine, Moroz was the leader of the Communist Party in the Verkhovna Rada. On 26 October 1991, he arranged the congress that formed the Socialist Party of Ukraine (SPU) as a successor of the Soviet-era Communist Party of Ukraine.

Moroz ran as a presidential candidate as a nominee of the Socialist Party of Ukraine in the 1994 and 1999 presidential elections, but he came third both times, with 13.04% of the vote in 1994 and 11.29% in 1999. In 1999, many experts predicted that Moroz had a chance to defeat incumbent Leonid Kuchma in the election run-off and according to many observers the government rigged the election results in favour of Petro Symonenko (of the Communist Party of Ukraine) in order to make sure that unpopular Symonenko, rather than Moroz, would compete against Kuchma in the run-off vote.

In 1996, Moroz together with several other parties prevented President Kuchma's attempt to concentrate most of the powers in the President's hands and led the Verkhovna Rada to adopt on 28 June the new Constitution that includes many positions close to the demands of left-wing parties. After signing the treaty of "Kanev Four" in 1999, he became an acknowledged leader of the non-Communist opposition to Kuchma.

At a 2001 sitting of the Verkhovna Rada, Moroz made public Mykola Melnychenko’s tapes that alleged the involvement of the leaders of Ukraine, including Kuchma, in the murder of famous independent journalist Georgiy Gongadze that provoked the political crisis in Ukraine known as the Cassette Scandal. Moroz was a member of a special board "Forum of national salvation", a representative of a Public Committee of Protection of the Constitution "Ukraine without Kuchma" and later "Rise, Ukraine!" in charge of negotiations with representatives of the regime.

Following the 2002 parliamentary election, the Socialist Party (which included Yuriy Lutsenko, Josef Vinski, Mykola Rudkovski and Valentyna Semenyuk) was the fourth-largest party in the Verkhovna Rada. The Socialists joined the "Oppositional Four", a group of parties that also included Our Ukraine, Yulia Tymoshenko Electoral Bloc and the Communist Party of Ukraine.

Orange Revolution and election defeat 
In the 2004 presidential election, Moroz was nominated by the Socialist Party which he has chaired since 1991. He won third place with 5.81% of the vote. As a long-time leader of anti-Kuchma forces, Moroz quickly announced his support for Viktor Yushchenko's presidential bid against Kuchma's Prime Minister Viktor Yanukovych, thus making Yushchenko the favourite to win in round two. That Yushchenko did not win despite this endorsement was used to argue that there was election fraud in the run-off.
Moroz supported the subsequent Orange Revolution, the mass protests that eventually led to the annulment of the vote results and to a revote won by Yushchenko. The support of the Socialist Party he brought to Yushchenko's campaign was important to widen Yushchenko's appeal to voters. Similarly, the votes of Moroz's Socialist Party faction in the Verkhovna Rada were crucial for passing several important resolutions during the Orange Revolution, particularly the non-confidence vote in the Kuchma–Yanukovych government involved in election fraud scandal.

After the 2006 parliamentary election, Moroz was elected the Chairman of the Verkhovna Rada of Ukraine on 6 July 2006 (238 ayes, 226 needed for election) with support of the Party of Regions, the Socialist Party and Communist factions. The Socialist Party of Ukraine received 2.86% of the national vote in the 2007 parliamentary election, falling 0.14% below the election threshold, denying them the right of representation and removing Moroz as a member of the Verkhovna Rada.

Subsequent political activities 
The Socialist Party chose the party leader Oleksandr Moroz as their presidential candidate for the 2010 presidential election, whose first-round ballot was scheduled to be held on 17 January 2010. 268 out of 422 party congress delegates registered supported Moroz's nomination. During the election, Moroz received 0,38% of the votes. Public opinion polls did not rate the Socialist Party or its leader Moroz as they were undecided as to their participation in the presidential election. In 2005, Moroz received 5.8% of the national vote. An opinion polls conducted by FOM-Ukraine in April 2009 showed Moroz with less than 1% support, with most analysts not considering Moroz as a serious contender as he would not win sufficient number of votes in the first-round presidential ballot, scheduled for 17 January 2010.

After leading his party for twenty years, Moroz was succeeded as party leader by Vasyl Tsushko in July 2010. However, he was again elected as party leader in August 2011. In April 2012, Petro Ustenko was elected as Moroz's successor as party leader.

Moroz tried to return to the Verkhovna Rada in the 2012 parliamentary election, running as an independent candidate for single-member district number 93 (first-past-the-post winning a seat) located in Kyiv Oblast. Moroz was unsuccessful, finishing in third with 11.94% of the vote.

In the 2019 Ukrainian presidential election, Moroz was a candidate for the Socialist Party of Oleksandr Moroz.

Political views 
Since organising the left-leaning Socialist Party of Ukraine, his party ideology largely evolved from orthodox communism to social democracy. He himself is a left-wing social democrat, though he has used both Marxist and social democratic rhetoric. For his moderate ideals, he met strong opposition from the more conservative wing of his party, represented by the supporters of Nataliya Vitrenko. Vitrenko eventually left the Socialist Party, proclaimed the Progressive Socialist Party of Ukraine, and branded Moroz as an "opportunist" and "traitor", helping Kuchma to fight the opposition of Ukraine, which included the Socialist Party. After the last radicals headed by Ivan Chyzh left the party and formed an organization called Spravedlyvist (Justness), Moroz was able to transform his party closer to the European social democratic model.

Moroz and his party supported the political reform and Ukraine's transition towards a more European parliamentary democracy which shifted the power balance in Ukraine stripping the President of some of his powers in favour of the Verkhovna Rada. During the Orange Revolution, his party voted for changes to the Constitution of Ukraine, changes which reduced the powers of the presidency. Moroz has also spoken in support of the preservation of land for Ukrainian farmers and has made many promises about resolving social problems using socialist rhetoric. The program of his party begins with a statement that demands real democracy for working people.

In a 2018 interview on 112 Ukraine, Moroz claimed that the world is controlled by a cabal including the Federal Reserve and the Rockefeller, Rothschild, and Morgan families, which stabilises the global economy and appoints world leaders. He also stated that the main opponents of this cabal are Russia and China, and asserted that former President Yushchenko is a puppet of the United States Department of State, which, according to Moroz, is itself controlled by this cabal.

Bibliography 
Moroz is fond of poetry and chess. He has written the following books:
 
 
 
 
 
 
 
 
  Recognized by international literature award named after Hryhori Skovoroda.
 
  Poetry collection in Ukrainian language.
  Poetry collection in Russian language.
 .

Notes

References

External links
 Socialist Party of Ukraine (website, in Ukrainian)
 "Tovarysh", the official newspaper of the Socialist Party of Ukraine (website, Ukrainian and Russian versions)

1944 births
Living people
People from Kyiv Oblast
National University of Life and Environmental Sciences of Ukraine alumni
Ukrainian agriculturists
Politicians of the Ukrainian Soviet Socialist Republic
Chairmen of the Verkhovna Rada
Socialist Party of Ukraine politicians
Communist Party of Ukraine (Soviet Union) politicians
20th-century Ukrainian politicians
Candidates in the 1994 Ukrainian presidential election
Candidates in the 1999 Ukrainian presidential election
Candidates in the 2004 Ukrainian presidential election
Candidates in the 2010 Ukrainian presidential election
21st-century Ukrainian politicians
Candidates in the 2019 Ukrainian presidential election